Gasny is a commune in the Eure department in northern France.

Population

Personalities
 Georges Baptiste François Allix (1808-1881), military engineer in the French Navy.

See also
Communes of the Eure department

References

Communes of Eure